Crane Creek Regional Park is a regional park east of Rohnert Park, California, U.S.A. which is maintained by the Sonoma County Regional Parks Department. The park entrance is at 6107 Pressley Road.

Facilities and features

The park features numerous unpaved trails suitable for hiking, including:
Creek Trail
Hawk Ridge Trail
Lupine Trail
Poppy Trail
Sunset Trail

There is also a loop trail (Fiddleneck Trail, Buckeye Trail, Northern Look Trail) suitable for bicycling or horseback riding.  There are picnic tables and latrines near the parking area.  Crane Creek flows through the park from southeast to northwest.

History
The land, originally homesteaded by Robert Crane in 1852, was purchased by the county in 1975 using grant money from Land and Water Conservation Funds.  A botanical study performed in 1991 found significant damage to the wildflower meadows.  This finding resulted in the exclusion of bicycles and horses from the meadow areas.

See also
 Crane Creek

References

External links

Parks in Sonoma County, California
Regional parks in California
Sonoma Mountains